The NCAA Season 95 volleyball tournaments started on January 10, 2020 at the Filoil Flying V Centre in San Juan, Philippines. Both the men's and women's tournament were cancelled due to the impact of the COVID-19 pandemic in the Philippines.

All teams participated in an elimination round which is a single round robin tournament. The top four teams was supposed to qualify for the semifinals, where the unbeaten team bounces through the finals, with a thrice-to-beat advantage, higher-seeded team possesses the twice-to-beat advantage, or qualify to the first round. The winners were to qualify to the finals.

Men's tournament

Team line-up

Elimination round

Team standings
Point system:
 3 points = win match in 3 or 4 sets
 2 points = win match in 5 sets
 1 point  = lose match in 5 sets
 0 point  = lose match in 3 or 4 sets

Match-up results

Scores

Women's tournament

Team line-up

Elimination round

Team standings

Point system:
 3 points = win match in 3 or 4 sets
 2 points = win match in 5 sets
 1 point  = lose match in 5 sets
 0 point  = lose match in 3 or 4 sets

Match-up results

Scores

Boys' tournament

Team line-up

Team standings
Point system:
 3 points = win match in 3 or 4 sets
 2 points = win match in 5 sets
 1 point  = lose match in 5 sets
 0 point  = lose match in 3 or 4 sets

Match-up results

Scores

Girls' tournament
The girls tournament is introduced as a demonstration sport.

Elimination round

Team standings
Point system:
 3 points = win match in 3 or 4 sets
 2 points = win match in 5 sets
 1 point  = lose match in 5 sets
 0 point  = lose match in 3 or 4 sets

Match-up results

Scores

Postponement
On January 13, the juniors, men's and women's matches between Arellano University and Emilio Aguinaldo College, and the Mapúa University and College of St. Benilde were postponed due to ash fall following the eruption of Taal Volcano.

As a precautionary measure in light of the Novel Coronavirus (COVID-19) outbreak, the NCAA management committee decided to postpone all Season 95 sporting events starting February 14. All juniors' games were postponed starting February 7. Games was originally planned to resume on March 16 after a month of halt following the outbreak. The women's and men's tournament were later cancelled altogether.

See also
UAAP Season 82 volleyball tournaments

References

NCAA (Philippines) volleyball tournaments
2020 in Philippine sport
Sports events curtailed due to the COVID-19 pandemic